The J. S. Bronaugh House, at 103 N. 2nd St. in Nicholasville, Kentucky, was listed on the National Register of Historic Places in 1984.

It was an Italianate-style two-story brick house with an L-shaped plan and an octagonal projecting bay at its ell gable end.

The house is no longer standing.

References

National Register of Historic Places in Jessamine County, Kentucky
Italianate architecture in Kentucky
Former buildings and structures in Kentucky
Houses in Jessamine County, Kentucky
Houses on the National Register of Historic Places in Kentucky
Nicholasville, Kentucky